Part of the Syrian Civil War, the Rif Dimashq Governorate campaign consisted of several battles and offensives across the governorate including the Syrian capital of Damascus:

Offensives 
Rif Dimashq clashes (November 2011–March 2012): Damascus centre under government control, protests largely suppressed in the city.
Battle of Damascus (2012): rebels first infiltration of Damascus from the surrounding countryside.
Rif Dimashq offensive (August–October 2012): Syrian Army seizes more than half a dozen rebel-held towns north, west and south of Damascus, rebels retain control of the Ghouta area, east of Damascus.
Rif Dimashq offensive (November 2012–February 2013): Free Syrian Army takes control of Darayya, Zamalka, Harasta and Arbin, offensive stalls in early January 2013, due to continuing air-strikes. Army launches a major offensive on rebel-held Darayya in mid-January.
Siege of Darayya and Muadamiyat (November 2012–October 2016): rebels surrender Darayya as well as Mudamiyat al-Sham to the government and leave both towns.
Damascus offensive (2013) (6 February – 25 March 2013): rebel operations around Damascus city ring.
Siege of Eastern Ghouta (May 2013 – April 2018): The Syrian Army captures Eastern Ghouta.
Rif Dimashq offensive (March–August 2013): Syrian Army captures the towns of Jdaidet al-Fadl, Jdeidit Artouz, Otaiba, Qaysa, Jarba, Harran Al-Awamid and Abadeh cutting the main rebel supply line into Damascus. Syrian Army surrounds the rebel-held Eastern Ghouta area, surrounds and partially advances into the rebel-held Qaboun, Barzeh and Jobar suburbs.
Rif Dimashq offensive (September–November 2013): Syrian Army captures the towns of Shaba’a, Sheikh Omar, al-Thiabiya, Husseiniya, Bweida, Hatetat al-Turkman, Al-Sabinah.
Battle of Al-Malihah: Syrian Army captures Al-Maliha after a four-month battle.
Rif Dimashq offensive (August–November 2014): Syrian Army captures Heteta al-Jersh and Adra and recaptures al-Dukhaniyya and Kabbasa.
Battle of Yarmouk Camp (2015): the Islamic State of Iraq and the Levant (ISIS or ISIL) invades Yarmouk Camp, with aid from al-Nusra Front, and manages to capture 95% of the camp on 7 April, before Syrian rebel groups and the Syrian Army launch a counterattack on 12 April to drive ISIL and al-Nusra Front out of the area.
Rif Dimashq offensive (September 2015): limited rebel gains.
Al-Dumayr offensive (April 2016): Syrian Army repels ISIL's offensive.
East Ghouta inter-rebel conflict (April–May 2016): rebel infighting between Jaish al-Fustat and Jaysh al-Islam.
Rif Dimashq offensive (April–May 2016): Army territorial gains in rebel strongholds of Deir al-Asafir and Zabdin.
Rif Dimashq offensive (June–October 2016): Large Army gains in the northeastern section of Eastern Ghouta.
Eastern Qalamoun offensive (September–October 2016): Indecisive.
Khan al-Shih offensive (October–November 2016): Army captures the Khan al-Shih rebel pocket of Western Ghouta.
Wadi Barada offensive (2016–17): Army captures Wadi Barada after a three-year siege.
Qaboun offensive (2017): Army captures the Qaboun, Barzeh and Tishrin neighborhoods of Damascus.
East Ghouta inter-rebel conflict (April–May 2017): Indecisive.
Syrian Desert campaign (May–July 2017): Syrian Army and allies victory.
2017 Jobar offensive: Syrian Army offensive stalled; Army advance on Jobar repelled by rebels.
Beit Jinn offensive: Syrian forces regain control of Beit Jinn.
Battle of Harasta (2017–18): Indecisive.
Southern Damascus offensive (January - February 2018): ISIS seize 90% of Yarmouk.
Rif Dimashq offensive (February–April 2018): decisive Syrian Army and allies Victory. Syrian government takes control over the Eastern Ghouta.
2nd Southern Damascus offensive (March 2018): ISIL victory.
Eastern Qalamoun offensive (April 2018): Syrian Army and allies victory.
3rd Southern Damascus offensive (April-May 2018): Syrian Army and allies victory. Syrian government regains control over the whole Rif Dimashq and Damascus Governorates.

References

Rif Dimashq Governorate in the Syrian civil war
Military operations of the Syrian civil war in 2011
Military operations of the Syrian civil war in 2012
Military operations of the Syrian civil war in 2013
Military operations of the Syrian civil war in 2014
Military operations of the Syrian civil war in 2015
Military operations of the Syrian civil war in 2016
Military operations of the Syrian civil war in 2017
Military operations of the Syrian civil war in 2018

pt:Ofensivas de Rif Dimashq